Percy Landsberg (18 June 1936 – 13 February 2018) was a South African rugby and footballer who played professional rugby league for English club St Helens between 1959 and 1960.

Background
Landsberg was born in the Copperbelt Province of what was then Northern Rhodesia.  On leaving school he went to work in the mines and played rugby union for the Nchanga club in Chingola as well as at representative level for Rhodesia.

Rugby League
In 1959 Landsberg was recommended to English club St Helens by another of the club's South African players, Tom van Vollenhoven. Through an intermediary an approach was made to Landsberg and in September 1959 he agreed to the offer to change codes and travelled to England. He scored two tries and kicked four goals during the season.

He was fullback in the Lancashire Cup final victory 15–9 over Swinton at Central Park, Wigan on 29 October 1960. A week later he played against Whitehaven, but then left St Helens to return to South Africa, as he had not settled in England. During the 1960–61 season he made 14 appearances kicking seven goals.

Return to South Africa
Landsberg returned to the mines in the Copperbelt. He was unable to play rugby union as the South African Rugby Board banned him for professionalism.  Instead he played football and baseball, appearing for Northern Rhodesia at football. In later life he moved south to Durban and then Pretoria.  He died in South Africa on 13 February 2018.

Notes

References

1936 births
2018 deaths
Rugby league centres
Rugby league fullbacks
South African rugby league players
St Helens R.F.C. players
Zimbabwe international rugby union players